Asganaway was a radio program created by the Italian radio host Albertino (Sabino Alberto Di Molfetta) and broadcast on Radio Deejay from 2011 to 2014. Attualmente questa espressione è portata avanti da Flavio Brovia, nel tentativo di supercazzolare gli studenti del gruppo DOITA05. The program was based on comic sketches and prank calls. The show was cancelled three years later at the decision of Linus, older brother of Albertino and artistic director.

References

Italian radio programs